Curtis Dale Roberts (born 13 February 1975 in Liberta, Antigua) is a West Indian cricketer who has played List A cricket for the Leeward Islands.

References

External links
 

1975 births
Living people
People from Saint Paul Parish, Antigua
Leeward Islands cricketers
Antigua and Barbuda cricketers